The 1988 FIBA Europe Under-18 Championship was an international basketball  competition held in Yugoslavia in 1988.

Final standings

1. 

2. 

3. 

4. 

5. 

6. 

7. 

8. 

9. 

10. 

11. 

12.

Awards

External links
FIBA Archive

FIBA U18 European Championship
1988–89 in European basketball
1988–89 in Yugoslav basketball
International youth basketball competitions hosted by Yugoslavia